Cipher Complex is a cancelled stealth action video game that was being developed for the Microsoft Windows, PlayStation 3 and Xbox 360 systems by Edge of Reality. The game was first announced in June 2006, by which time it was reported to already have been in production and self-funded for two years; the title was then signed with Sega in 2007, but in July 2009 it was revealed that the game had been cancelled by the publisher earlier that year after over half a decade of work, as noted in the LinkedIn profile of a former internal producer at the studio. Further details surrounding the cancellation and the game's fate in their entirety remain unclear to this day, as no official announcement regarding its status has been made by either Sega or Edge of Reality, however, more recently, a U.S. federal trademark registration was filed on September 11, 2009, which as of October 19, 2011, has been granted a third extension. While confirming nothing else, this does indicate that Edge of Reality has retained the intellectual property rights to the game.

Although the game was widely believed to be cancelled by Sega, game designer Phil Fogerite (who worked as level designer on the project from March 2008 to April 2009) has most stated in 2011 that Edge of Reality itself had in fact decided to put the game on indefinite hold.

Gameplay
Edge of Reality was hoping to "revolutionize" the stealth action genre. The main character carries out various actions with speed, precision, strength and cunning stealth to neutralize enemies.

In June 2010, gameplay footage of a level from Cipher Complex was leaked online via Dailymotion, depicting the player character (Cipher) infiltrating a steel mill in China, under orders to extract a General who is being held hostage; in addition, short clips of gameplay can be seen on Edge of Reality's official homepage. An "in-game screenshot" of the steel mill level, as well as some concept art, textures and logos from the game have also been posted to Picasa by the lead environment artist, who has since clarified that it is a demo level. Part of an early cinematic as well as some character animations were again posted via Dailymotion in March 2011. Gameplay from an unreleased demo and testing environment was published by the Hard4Games channel on YouTube in April 2018.

Plot
The official storyline, as quoted from the game's original press release, is as follows:
U.S. surveillance satellites detect activity onboard the decommissioned Soviet Bargration Missile Defense Station 4 off the east coast of Siberia. When the Russians deny the U.S. access to the facility, Department of Defense strategists suggest that a small, plausibly deniable reconnaissance mission be sent in to investigate. The Defense Threat Reduction Agency is given the go-ahead for operation BLACKOUT, the insertion of a single expert Operator on Russian WMDs and launch facilities. Lt. Col. John Sullivan, callsign: Cipher is air dropped in, and what was supposed to be primarily a reconnaissance mission becomes a race against a terrorist threat; one with implications that will shake the foundations of American democracy and freedoms.

It is unknown to what extent the game's plot changed during development. As such, the synopsis outlined above may not be indicative of the final plot intended for the game.

References

External links
 Announcement
 IGN
Official website

PlayStation 3 games
Stealth video games
Xbox 360 games
Cancelled PlayStation 3 games
Cancelled Windows games
Cancelled Xbox 360 games
Vaporware video games
Multiplayer and single-player video games